Yeoh Seng Zoe (born 28 September 1997) is a Malaysian badminton player. He won the first international title at 2019 Nepal International.

Career 
He started off his junior career by winning the Uganda International title with partner Chong Chun Quan. He then competed in the 2015 BWF World Junior Championships where he lost to Firman Abdul Kholik in the fourth round. He was part of the squad that participated in the 2015 BWF World Junior Championships team events. 

In 2017, he left the Badminton Association of Malaysia to play as an independent player. In 2019, he won the Nepal International by defeating Swarnaraj Bora with a score of 21-19, 21-8. In 2021, he won his first International title at the Irish Open which is considered his biggest career win to date.

In 2022, he got into the finals of the Swedish Open but had to concede a walkover after sustaining an injury. He then won the 2022 Austrian Open.

Achievements

BWF International Challenge/Series (4 titles, 2 runner-up) 
Men singles

Men's doubles

  BWF International Challenge tournament
  BWF International Series tournament
  BWF Future Series tournament

References

External links 
 

1997 births
Living people
People from Penang
Malaysian sportspeople of Chinese descent
Malaysian male badminton players
21st-century Malaysian people